The Pearl River map turtle (Graptemys pearlensis) is a species of emydid turtle native to the southern United States. According to a study done in January 2017, the species G. pearlensis was significantly less abundant in the Pearl River region as compared to G. oculifera and exhibited a smaller number of reproductively mature females. Further, this study highlighted statistical and observational evidence that this species exhibited female-biased, sexual dimorphism.

Geographic range
It is endemic to the Pearl River in Louisiana and Mississippi. The ringed map turtle (G. oculifera) is also endemic to the Pearl River.

Taxonomy
Until 2010, it was included in the Pascagoula map turtle (G. gibbonsi), which it resembles. In 2010 Ennen and colleagues described Graptemys pearlensis as a new species. They used sequence variation of the mitochondrial control region along with the ND4 gene and found out three samples of Graptemys pearlensis constituting reciprocally monophyletic sister clades.

References

External links

Graptemys
Reptiles of the United States
Endemic fauna of the United States
Reptiles described in 2010